"You" is a song by American R&B artist Lloyd featuring rapper Lil Wayne, and was produced by Big Reese and Jasper Cameron for Lloyd's second studio album, Street Love. It was recorded in the producer's basement. It is the first official single off the album. Lloyd himself has reported that he leaked the song to an Atlanta radio station to receive airplay.  Originally, the song featured Atlanta rapper Tango Redd, but he was replaced with Lil Wayne for the official release. The song features an interpolation of Spandau Ballet's song "True". On February 17, 2007, "You" became Lloyd's first and Lil Wayne's second top-ten single on the U.S. Billboard Hot 100, charting at number nine. The song reached number one on the US Hot R&B/Hip-Hop Songs chart in February 2007, becoming both Lloyd and Lil Wayne's first number-one single on this chart. On the UK Singles Chart, the single debuted on May 28, 2007, at number sixty-six on download sales alone, and moved up to number forty-five.

Music video
The music video features D. Woods, former member of the girl group Danity Kane and Amanda Saintana Ceus, as the leading lady. The video was inducted into the U.S. BET 106 & Park video hall of fame, after spending sixty-five days on the countdown, thirty-four of which were at number one.

Remixes
The official remix features rappers André 3000 and Nas and 2 new verses by Lloyd. On the album, it is titled "I Want You (Remix)". It also samples Spandau Ballet's song "True". The remix is included in the album as the 15th track. On the remix's leaked version, Lloyd's 2nd verse from the original version of the song was used after the chorus, instead of the 2nd new verse on the album version.

Charts

Weekly charts

Year-end charts

Certifications

See also
List of number-one R&B singles of 2007 (U.S.)

References

2006 singles
Lloyd (singer) songs
Lil Wayne songs
Songs written by Lil Wayne
2006 songs
Songs written by Lloyd (singer)
Universal Music Group singles
Songs written by Jasper Cameron
Songs written by Gary Kemp